The bell gable is an architectural element crowning the upper end of the wall of church buildings, usually in lieu of a church tower. It consists of a gable end in stone, with small hollow semi-circular arches where the church bells are placed. It is a characteristic example of the simplicity of Romanesque architecture.

Overview
The bell-gables or espadañas are a feature of Romanesque architecture in Spain. They replaced the bell tower beginning the 12th century due to the Cistercian reformation that called for a more simplified and less ostentatious churches, but also for economical and practical reasons as the Reconquista accelerated and wider territory needed to be re-christianized building more temples and espadañas were cheaper and simpler to build. Today, they are a common sighting in small village churches throughout Spain and Portugal. This simple and sober architectural element would later be brought to the Americas and the Philippines by the Iberian colonizers, where it would find widespread use especially in the earliest structures.

The bell gable usually rises over the front façade wall, but in some churches it may be located on top of any other wall or even on top of the toral arch in the midst of the roof.
In the Spanish regions of Catalonia and the Valencian Community, the bell-gables are also known as campanar de paret (wall bell tower) or campanar de cadireta. (little-chair bell tower) because it reminds one of the back of a chair.

In Écija, Spain,  the bell tower of the church of Santa Bárbara fell destroyed by a lightning strike in 1892 and was replaced by an espadaña, a more expedient solution than rebuilding the tower.

Main types and styles

See also
Bell-cot
Bell tower
Zvonnitsa

References

External links

Bamboo or Brick: The travails of building churches in Spanish Colonial Philippines by Jose Regalado Trota, Ayala Museum

Church architecture
Architectural elements
Types of wall
Articles containing video clips